The Departmental Council of Vosges is the deliberative assembly of the Vosges department in the region of Grand Est. It consists of 34 members (departmental councilors) from 17 cantons and its headquarters are in Épinal.

The President of the Departmental Council is François Vannson.

Vice-Presidents 
The President of the Departmental Council is assisted by 10 vice-presidents chosen from among the departmental councillors. Each of them has a delegation of authority.

See also 

 Vosges
 Departmental council (France)

References

External links
 Departmental Council of Vosges (official website)

Vosges (department)
Vosges